is a Japanese former volleyball player who competed in the 1972 Summer Olympics.

In 1972, he was part of the Japanese team which won the gold medal in the Olympic tournament. He played five matches.

References

1946 births
Living people
Japanese men's volleyball players
Olympic gold medalists for Japan
Olympic volleyball players of Japan
Medalists at the 1972 Summer Olympics
Volleyball players at the 1972 Summer Olympics
20th-century Japanese people